Ache is a You've Got Foetus on Your Breath album first released in 1982 on Self Immolation Records.  Thirsty Ear reissued the album as a CD in 1997 in the US.  Both releases were limited editions: only 1,500 copies of the LP and 4,000 copies of the CD were produced. Ache, along with its predecessor, Deaf, was recorded in an 8-track studio.

The Ache LP is Self Immolation #WOMB OYBL 2.  The CD re-release is Ectopic Ents #ECT ENTS 013.

Reception 

AllMusic (Andy Hinds) - "Seemingly a musical omnivore, [Foetus] devours everything and spits it back out in a scrap heap of sonic chaos, twisted beyond recognition. His oblique yet subversive lyrical themes don't make Ache any more palatable for the faint of heart. This is the sound of unfiltered imagination, absolutely unencumbered by notions of commerce or accessibility. Brilliant."
NME - "Ache is possessed by a bristling, maniacal intelligence which spews out a jostling, surreal collage of subverted musical and verbal cliches, wired word associations, epigrams and sheer invictive with frantic urgency and gleefully black humor. Ache is one of the most violently original and compelling records I've heard in ages.  It would make an ideal Christmas present."

Track listing

Personnel 
Harlan Cockburn – engineering
J. G. Thirlwell (as You've Got Foetus On Your Breath) – instruments, production, illustrations

References

External links 
 
 Ache at foetus.org

1982 albums
Foetus (band) albums
Albums produced by JG Thirlwell
Thirsty Ear Recordings albums